Mugisha is a surname/lastname commonly used in East Africa from Rwanda and parts of Uganda, meaning "Blessing" from Kinyarwanda (Rwanda) or "Luck" from Rukiiga/Runyankole (Uganda). Notable persons with this last name include the following:

 Frank Mugisha, Ugandan LGBT rights activist
 Fredrick Mugisha (born 1963), Ugandan military officer
 Godfrey Mugisha (born 1978), Ugandan football player
 Joseph Mugisha (born 1960), Ugandan mathematician
 Maud Kamatenesi Mugisha (born 1969), Ugandan natural scientist
 Maurice Mugisha, Ugandan journalist
 Nathan Mugisha, Ugandan military officer
 Samuel Mugisha (born 1997), Rwandan cyclist
 Cedrick Mugisha (born 1997), Spanish football player and actor